Giuseppe Dossetti (13 February 1913 – 15 December 1996) was an Italian jurist, a politician, and from 1958 onward, a Catholic priest.

Political career 
Dossetti was born in Genoa, the son of a piedmontese pharmacist and a mother from Reggio Emilia, where the family settled quite soon to manage a pharmacy in the nearby agricultural and small industrial town of Cavriago. When he was young, he joined Azione Cattolica ("Catholic Action"), and he obtained a law degree at 21 years of age. Soon after, as fairly common among young graduates at the time, even Catholics, particularly in the Bologna and Reggio Emilia area, he joined the Fascist party and became an appreciated speaker at student meetings organized by the fascist student organization (Guf). After postgraduate work in Canon and Roman Law at the Catholic University of Milan, in 1940 he passed  the exam for teaching the discipline at university level and in 1942 he was appointed professor at the University of Modena, the youngest college teacher in the Kingdom of Italy. Later on, moved by profound political and moral beliefs, antifascist, he joined the Italian Resistance under the name of "Benigno" and became President of the Committee for National Liberation of Reggio Emilia, even if he always refused to use weapons.

His political career was very fast. In 1945 he became vice-secretary of Democrazia Cristiana, and on 2 June 1946 was elected to become part of the "Costituente" (the political body in charge of drafting the new Italian republican constitution), of which he became one of the most active members. Exactly he took part in the first Subcommission in charge of the "rights and duties of the citizens". In 1946, with Amintore Fanfani, Giorgio La Pira and Giuseppe Lazzati (described, not without a bit of deprecation, as "little professors") he founded the association Civitas Humana.

Dossetti was an atypical politician. He decided not to rerun for the 1948 elections and changed the idea only to obey to Monsignor Montini (Pope Paolo VI). His evangelist positions were more or less opposed to the Alcide De Gasperi's more pragmatic ones. He was against NATO accession of Italy, which he considered dangerous, and in favour of social reforms aimed at helping the poorer parts of the population. Dossetti was presented to the Congress with over one-third consensus. The contraposition with De Gasperi was very clear. He accepted the challenge and returned as deputy secretary of the party. During the following years, he was actively involved in working at many reforms, including the Cassa del Mezzogiorno. He left politics in 1951, and he returned for a while in 1956 just to run for mayor in Bologna, in which City Council he will stay for the following two years.

After politics 

In the meantime, on 6 January 1956, he took religious vows after that, some months before, the Church authorities approved the monastic community of the "Piccola famiglia dell'Annunziata", founded by him and based on "silence, prayer, work, and poverty".  After three years, he was ordained a priest.

During the 1960s, he contributed as a collaborator of Cardinal Lercaro, but since his presence was not welcome by some sectors of the ecclesiastical hierarchy, he chose to retire in silence. According to Cardinal Giacomo Biffi, Dossetti's personal role during the Second Vatican Council was of great importance, because he contributed to making the Council less conservative and traditional than what was originally planned.

During the following years, his community expanded: from the first section near Bologna, in Terrasanta, to Giordania in Casaglia di Montesole. He reappeared in public in 1994, when he publicly expressed his worries for the proposed modifications of the Italian constitution. Dossetti died two years later, on 15 December 1996.

Selected works 
 Politics 
 Sentinella, quanto resta della notte? Commemorazione di G. Lazzati nell'anniversario della morte, San Lorenzo, Reggio Emilia, 1994
 A. Melloni (cur.), La ricerca costituente (1945-1952), Il Mulino, Bologna, 1994
 I valori della Costituzione, San Lorenzo, Reggio Emilia, 1995
 G. Trotta (a cura di), Scritti politici (1943-1951), San Lorenzo, Reggio Emilia, 1995
 R. Villa (a cura di), Giuseppe Dossetti. Due anni a Palazzo d'Accursio. Discorsi a Bologna 1956-1958, Aliberti editore, Reggio Emilia, 2004

 Religion
 A. Alberigo - G. Alberigo (a cura di), Con Dio e con la storia. Una vicenda di cristiano e di uomo, Marietti, 1986
 Non restare in silenzio, mio Dio, San Lorenzo, Reggio Emilia, 1987
 G. Dossetti - U. Neri, La gioia del cristiano, San Lorenzo, Reggio Emilia, 1987
Credo in un solo Dio padre onnipotente. Il problema di Dio, il mondo spirituale e l'idolatria, il fine soprannaturale dell'uomo, San Lorenzo, Reggio Emilia, 1990
Credo in un solo Signore Gesù Cristo, San Lorenzo, Reggio Emilia, 1991
Credo in un solo Signore Gesù Cristo. Figlio di Dio crocifisso, San Lorenzo, Reggio Emilia, 1992
 C. M. Martini -  G. Dossetti - U. Neri, Come un bambino in braccio alla madre. Atti del Convegno (il 17 febbraio 1993), San Lorenzo, Reggio Emilia, 1993
 Conversazioni, In Dialogo, 1994
 L' esegesi spirituale secondo d. Divo Barsotti, San Lorenzo, Reggio Emilia, 1995
 Il concilio ecumenico Vaticano II. Prolusione inaugurale per l'anno accademico 1994-'95 dello Studio teologico interdiocesano di Reggio Emilia, San Lorenzo, Reggio Emilia, 1995
Il Vaticano II. Frammenti di una riflessione, Il Mulino, 1996
 Piccola famiglia dell'Annunziata (a cura di), La parola e il silenzio. Discorsi e scritti 1986-1995, Il Mulino, Bologna, 1997
 Eucaristia e città, AVE, 1997
 Piccola famiglia dell'Annunziata (a cura di), Un solo Signore. Esercizi spirituali, EDB, 2001
 Piccola famiglia dell'Annunziata (a cura di), L' identità del cristiano, EDB, 2001
 G. Alberigo - G. Ruggieri (a cura di), Per una «Chiesa eucaristica». Rilettura della portata dottrinale della costituzione liturgica del Vaticano II. Lezioni del 1965, Il Mulino, Bologna, 2002
Piccola famiglia dell'Annunziata (a cura di), La parola di Dio seme di vita e di fede incorruttibile, EDB, 2002
Il viaggio della vita. Un cammino spirituale per uscire dalla tossicodipendenza e diventare uomini, EDB, 2003
La piccola famiglia dell'Annunziata. Le origini e i testi fondativi 1953-1986, Paoline Editoriale Libri, 2004
Omelie del tempo di Natale, Paoline Editoriale Libri, 2004
Piccola famiglia dell'Annunziata (a cura di), Omelie e istruzioni pasquali 1968-1974, Paoline Editoriale Libri, 2005

 Law
Grandezza e miseria del diritto della Chiesa (raccolta di scritti), Il Mulino, Bologna, 1996

References 

Additional sources
A. Alberigo - G. Alberigo, Con tutte le tue forze. I nodi della fede cristiana oggi. Omaggio a Giuseppe Dossetti, Marietti, 1993
Vincenzo Saba, Quella specie di laburismo cristiano. Dossetti, Pastore, Romani e l'alternativa a De Gasperi (1946-1951), Edizioni Lavoro, 1996
Giuseppe Lazzati, Lazzati, Dossetti, il dossettismo, AVE, 1997
Vittorio Peri, La Pira, Lazzati, Dossetti. Nel silenzio la speranza, Studium, 1998
G. Alberigo (a cura di), Giuseppe Dossetti. Prime prospettive e ipotesi di ricerca, Il Mulino, Bologna, 1998
O. Marson - R. Villa (a cura di), Giuseppe Dossetti. Il circuito delle due parole, Nuova Dimensione, 2000
P. Acanfora - L. Santoro (a cura di), Giuseppe Dossetti, Morcelliana, 2002
M. Tancini (a cura di), Fondo «Cronache Sociali» 1947-1952. Con annessi documenti del vicesegratario della Democrazia Cristiana (1945-1951) Giuseppe Dossetti, Il Mulino, Bologna, 2002
Associazione Giorgio La Pira (a cura di), Con tutto il cuore, con tutta l'anima e la mente. Per ricordare e ripensare agli insegnamenti di don Giuseppe Dossetti, San Lorenzo, Reggio Emilia, 2002
Leopoldo Elia - Pietro Scoppola, A colloquio con Dossetti e Lazzati. Intervista (19 novembre 1984), Il Mulino, Bologna, 2003
Achille Ardigò, Giuseppe Dossetti e il Libro bianco su Bologna, EDB, 2003
L. Giorgi, Una vicenda politica. Giuseppe Dossetti 1945-1956, Edizioni Scriptorium, Milano, 2003
Giorgio Campanini, Dossetti politico, EDB, 2004
Salvatore Fangareggi, Il partigiano Dossetti, Aliberti editore, Reggio Emilia, 2004

1913 births
1996 deaths
Politicians from Genoa
Christian Democracy (Italy) politicians
Members of the National Council (Italy)
Members of the Constituent Assembly of Italy
Deputies of Legislature I of Italy
Clergy from Genoa
Italian resistance movement members
20th-century Italian Roman Catholic priests
University of Bologna alumni
Academic staff of the University of Modena and Reggio Emilia
Second Vatican Council